James Casey may refer to:

James Casey (Australian politician) (1831–1913), politician in colonial Victoria (Australia), Solicitor-General
James Casey (poet-priest) (1824–1909), priest and composer of temperance poetry
James S. Casey (1833–1899), US Army officer and Medal of Honor recipient
Doc Casey (1870–1936), baseball player
James E. Casey (1888–1983), American businessman
 James Casey (1892–1965) English music-hall comedian better known as Jimmy James (comedian)
James Vincent Casey (1914–1986), American bishop
James Casey (variety artist) (1922–2011), English variety comedian and BBC Radio producer
James J. Casey (1926–1989), American politician and civil servant
Jim Casey (footballer) (born 1957), Scottish football player
James Casey (American football) (born 1984), American football fullback

See also
James Cassie (1819–1879), Scottish painter
Casey James (born 1982), American singer
Kasey James, American wrestler
 Casey (disambiguation)
 James (disambiguation)